Helen Culver (1832–1925) was a successful real estate developer and philanthropist. She owned Hull House and rented it to Jane Addams, before later giving the property to Addams along with hundreds of thousands of dollars of donations, contributing substantially to founding the comprehensive settlement house movement in the United States. She was a trustee of Hull House until 1898.

Early life 
Culver was born in Little Valley, New York on March 3, 1832. She was the youngest of the four children of Lyman and Emeliza (Hull) Culver. Lyman Culver was a farmer and bought, cleared, and sold land. In 1838, Emeliza Culver died, and Helen Culver and her siblings were cared for by Lyman Culver's sisters until he remarried. Culver attended local schools and began teaching at a country school at age 14. She also enrolled in the Randolph Academy and Female Seminary in Randolph, New York. Her studies were interrupted when Lyman Culver suddenly died from Typhoid fever in 1852. His estate was bequeathed to his widow and two children from his second marriage. As a result, Helen Culver had to earn her own living at age 20.

Career 
Culver graduated from Randolph Academy in 1852. Following graduation, Culver moved west with her brother Robert, settling near their grandfather in DeKalb, Illinois. In 1853, she started a private school in Sycamore, Illinois in an abandoned schoolhouse, and she also taught at the Dow Academy. In 1854, Culver relocated to Chicago, and from 1854-1861 she served as teacher and principal in various Chicago schools. In this period, Culver developed her relationship with her cousin, Charles Jerold Hull, a real estate businessman. After Hull's wife, Melicent, died in 1860, Culver left public education to care for and teach Hull's son, Charles, and daughter, Fredrika.

During the American Civil War, Culver served as a nurse under the United States Sanitary Commission. After the Battle of Stones River, Culver was stationed near Murfreesboro, Tennessee and was put in charge of a one-room, forty-bed hospital. After the war, Culver returned to Chicago and the Hull family.

From 1868 to 1889 Culver worked with her cousin, Charles Hull, in his real estate ventures in Chicago and around the country, including Atlanta and Jacksonville, Florida. When Hull died in 1889, Culver inherited the real estate business.

Philanthropy 
Besides backing Jane Addams, Culver supported several other important scholarly causes, such as giving over $1.1 million to the University of Chicago, making her one of the University's most important early donors.  In 1906 she gave $50,000 to William I. Thomas to fund a study of The Polish Peasant in Europe and America.

Culver died in 1925.

References

External links 
 Helen Culver's letter to Jane Addams, October 19, 1920

1832 births
1925 deaths
People from Cattaraugus County, New York
American real estate businesspeople
American philanthropists
Settlement houses
American notaries
Philanthropists from New York (state)
Businesspeople from New York (state)
19th-century American businesspeople
19th-century American educators
19th-century American businesswomen